This is a list of Murder, She Wrote episodes in the order that they originally aired on CBS. Most of the episodes took place either in Jessica's fictional hometown of Cabot Cove, Maine, or in New York City, but her travels promoting books or visiting relatives and friends led to cases throughout the U.S. and around the world.

After the final episode aired in 1996, Angela Lansbury sporadically reprised the character of Jessica Fletcher in a handful of feature-length Murder, She Wrote specials starting in 1997. The last TV movie aired in May 2003. In February 2007, on the ABC daytime talk show The View, Lansbury announced that she hoped to make another Murder, She Wrote TV movie in the near future but only if her son, director Anthony Shaw, could find a suitable story.

Series overview

Episodes

Season 1 (1984–85)

Season 2 (1985–86)

Season 3 (1986–87)

Season 4 (1987–88)

Season 5 (1988–89)

Season 6 (1989–90)

Season 7 (1990–91)

Season 8 (1991–92)

Season 9 (1992–93)

Season 10 (1993–94)

Season 11 (1994–95)

Season 12 (1995–96)

TV movies

Home media

Explanatory notes

Citations

External links

Lists of American crime drama television series episodes
Murder, She Wrote